A penumbral lunar eclipse will take place on October 28, 2042, according to some sources. This will be 0.4 days after the Moon reached perigee (making it a supermoon). This event marks the beginning of lunar saros cycle 156 according to some sources, and will be visually imperceptible and other sources have this as a miss.

According to some sources, it will be the last of 5 Metonic cycle eclipses occurring every 19 years on October 28th, while the other sources calculate the Moon will miss the shadow.

Visibility

Related lunar eclipses

Lunar year series (354 days)

Metonic series 
This eclipse is the last of four Metonic cycle lunar eclipses on the same date, October 28–29, each separated by 19 years:

See also 
List of lunar eclipses and List of 21st-century lunar eclipses
February 1951 lunar eclipse
August 2016 lunar eclipse

Notes

External links 
 

2042-10
2042 in science